Brigadier General Hubert John Foster (4 October 1855 – 21 March 1919) was a senior officer in the British Army  and later Australian Army, who served as Chief of the Australian General Staff from 1916 to 1917.

Military career
Educated at Harrow School and the Royal Military Academy, Woolwich and having won the Pollock Medal there, Foster was commissioned into the Royal Engineers in 1875.

He was deployed to Cyprus when British troops occupied the island in 1878. He served in the Anglo-Egyptian War of 1882 and took part in the Battle of Tel el-Kebir and the occupation of Cairo. In 1886, he joined the staff of the Commander-in-Chief, Ireland. He transferred to the military intelligence division of the War Office in 1890.

In 1898 he was made Quartermaster-General of the Canadian Forces and managed the deployment of Canadian troops for the Second Boer War. In 1901 he went to Guernsey and Alderney as commanding Royal Engineer. Then in 1903 he was made British Military attaché in Washington, D. C. and Mexico City.

Foster became a leading military writer following his appointment in 1906 as Director of Military Science at the University of Sydney. He lobbied for the adoption of an expeditionary strategy with a major role for the Australian Army which was in sharp contrast to the views of Admiral Sir William Cresswell who advocated a policy of defending the shores of the continent of Australia.

Foster went on to serve in the First World War and was appointed Chief of the General Staff in January 1916. In March 1916 he became a temporary brigadier general in the Australian Military Forces (AMF). In October 1917 he became Director of Military Art at the Royal Military College, Duntroon but resigned after a year due to ill health.

He was placed on the retired list, AMF, as an honorary brigadier general on 19 October 1918. He died on 21 March 1919 at Carlaminda, near Cooma, New South Wales, and was buried in Cooma cemetery with Anglican rites. He was survived by his wife and their son, Sir John Galway Foster, who later became a member of the British House of Commons.

Family
In 1904 he married Mary Agatha Gough, née Tobin.

References

1855 births
1919 deaths
Australian generals
Australian military personnel of World War I
British Army personnel of the Anglo-Egyptian War
English emigrants to Australia
Graduates of the Royal Military Academy, Woolwich
People educated at Harrow School
People from Biggleswade
Royal Engineers officers
Academic staff of the University of Sydney
British military attachés
Chiefs of Army (Australia)
Military personnel from Bedfordshire
British Army personnel of the Second Boer War